The leader of the opposition is a position in the Parliament of Singapore referring to a politician who leads the largest opposition party in Singapore, typically the leader of the party possessing the most seats in Parliament that is not the governing party or part of the governing coalition.

The position was formally established in 2020, with the first and current de jure leader of the opposition being Pritam Singh, who is the current secretary general of the Workers' Party and the Member of Parliament of Aljunied GRC. Nevertheless, its position has existed de facto in Singaporean politics since 1955.

History
The leader of the opposition was formerly an unofficial de facto position in the Parliament of Singapore, as the constitution and standing orders of Parliament did not provide for such a position. 

The formal office was established in the aftermath of the 2020 general election, which saw the opposition Workers' Party winning ten seats in Parliament. Prime Minister Lee Hsien Loong announced the creation of the formal office and that the leader of the opposition would be provided with the appropriate manpower support and resources to perform the parliamentary role. As in other Commonwealth countries with a Westminster parliamentary system of government, the parliamentary appointment is supported with a secretariat and is additionally given office space in the Parliament buildings.

Due to its former status as a de facto role, the leader of the opposition did not draw any additional allowance by virtue of holding the position and were entitled only to the usual ordinary remuneration allowance granted to other regular Members of Parliament. With the creation of the formal office, Parliament announced that the appointment holder will draw an annual salary of S$385,000, double the salary of a regular MP.

Duties 
The leader of the opposition is expected to lead the opposition in presenting alternative views in parliamentary debates on policies, bills and motions, and organise the scrutiny of the Government’s positions and actions in Parliament and be consulted on the appointment of opposition members to Select Committees, including Standing Select Committees such as the Public Accounts Committee.

In addition to his parliamentary duties, the leader of the opposition may be called upon to take on other duties such as attending official state functions and taking part in visits and meetings alongside members of the Government and the Public Service.

Powers and resources 
In Parliament, the leader of the opposition will generally be given the right of first response among Members of Parliament, and will be allowed ask the lead question to the ministers on policies, bills and motions, subject to existing speaking conventions. The leader of the opposition will also be given a longer speaking duration for speeches, equivalent to that given to political officeholders.

In addition to the government data or information available to other MPs, the leader of the opposition will receive confidential briefings by the Government on select matters of national security and external relations, and in the event of a national crisis or emergency.

The leader of the opposition will be provided an office and the use of a meeting room in Parliament House. He will also receive allowances to hire up to three additional legislative assistants. This is in addition to the allowances all MPs receive for one legislative assistant and one secretarial assistant. The leader of the opposition will also be provided with a secretary to support him administratively with parliamentary business.

De facto leaders of the opposition

De jure leaders of the opposition

See also

Prime Minister of Singapore
Leader of the Opposition

References

Legislative branch of the Singapore Government
 Leader of the Opposition
Singapore